Ischnocampa styx is a moth of the family Erebidae. It was described by E. Dukinfield Jones in 1914. It is found in Brazil.

References

External links
 

Ischnocampa
Moths described in 1914